The lesser sac, also known as the omental bursa, is a part of the peritoneal cavity that is formed by the lesser and greater omentum.  Usually found in mammals, it is connected with the greater sac via the omental foramen or Foramen of Winslow. In mammals, it is common for the lesser sac to contain considerable amounts of fat.

Anatomic margins
Anterior margin listed from the top-to-bottom margin: Quadrate lobe of the liver, lesser omentum, stomach, gastrocolic ligament

Lateral margin listed from the most anterior to the most posterior margin: Gastrosplenic ligament, spleen, phrenicosplenic ligament

Posterior margin Left kidney and adrenal gland, pancreas

Inferior margin Greater omentum

Superior margin Liver

If any of the marginal structures rupture their contents could leak into the lesser sac. If the stomach were to rupture on its anterior side though the leak would collect in the greater sac.

The lesser sac is formed during embryogenesis from an infolding of the greater omentum. The open end of the infolding, known as the omental foramen is usually close to the stomach.

Additional images

See also
Terms for anatomical location
 Greater sac
 Omental foramen (Epiploic foramen, Foramen of Winslow)
 Lesser omentum
 Greater omentum
 Peritoneum

References

External links
  

General surgery
Abdomen

es:Mesenterio#Transcavidad de los epiplones